is a Japanese actor who is represented by the agency GVjp. He played the role of Kinji Takigawa/Star Ninger in the 2015 Super Sentai TV series Shuriken Sentai Ninninger.

On November 2, 2018, he changed his stage name to "多和田 任益" (reading is the same but the kanji is different).

Biography
Tawada won the special prize at the 2010 exclusive model audition of Fineboys. From 2012, Tawada appeared as Kunimitsu Tezuka in the Musical Prince of Tennis Second Season. From April 2015 to March 2016, he played the role of Kinji Takigawa/Star Ninger in the 39th Super Sentai series Shuriken Sentai Ninninger and in 2019, he played the role of Rentaro Kagura/Kamen Rider Shinobi in both Kamen Rider Zi-O episodes 17 and 18 and Rider Time: Kamen Rider Shinobi.

Filmography

TV series

Films

References

External links
 Official agency profile 

21st-century Japanese male actors
Japanese male models
1993 births
Living people
People from Osaka Prefecture